Salomé Stévenin (born 29 January 1985) is a French actress. She began her acting career at the age of 3 when she appeared alongside her father in the film Peaux des Vaches ("Thick Skinned") in 1989. Her recent appearances include the 2002 television film Clara cet été là (Clara's Summer) and Douches froides (Cold Showers) in 2005 for which she won the La Ciotat Film Festival Best Actress award.

She is the daughter of Jean-François Stévenin, and the sister of actors Sagamore Stévenin, Robinson Stévenin and Pierre Stévenin.

In 2015, she created a foundation Les merveilles du monde (The wonders of the world) working in India and Mexico to promote  peace, joy, love, childhood and spiritual development (« la paix, la joie, l’amour, l’enfance, le développement spirituel et le soin »).

Filmography

References

External links
 
 allocine entry
 5 interview with Salomé Stévenin on her role in Douches froides 

1985 births
Living people
People from Lons-le-Saunier
French child actresses
French film actresses
French television actresses
20th-century French actresses
21st-century French actresses
French women film directors
French women screenwriters
French screenwriters